Kenley is a small village and civil parish in the English county of Shropshire. It is near the larger villages of Acton Burnell, about three miles to the north-west, and Harley, about two miles to the east. The population of the civil parish at the 2011 census was 258.

The name is probably formed from the Old English personal name Cenna with -ley, meaning a clearing in a wood.

To the west are the hamlets of Ruckley and Langley, which form a separate civil parish.

The historian Archibald Alison and statistician William Farr were born in Kenley.

Notable people
Archibald Alison, (1757-1839), Scots essayist, onetime parish rector.
Sir Archibald Alison, 1st Baronet, (1792-1867), historian and advocate, his son
William Farr, (1807-1883), statistician

See also
Listed buildings in Kenley, Shropshire

References

External links

Villages in Shropshire
Civil parishes in Shropshire